Bogi Þorsteinsson (2 August 1918 – 17 December 1998) was the first chairman of the Icelandic Basketball Association, serving for eight years. For his work toward basketball in Iceland he was awarded the Knight's Cross of the Order of the Falcon.

Early life
Bogi graduated as a radio operator in 1941. Off the 45 crew and passengers on board, 3 passengers and 12 crew members perished.

References

1918 births
1998 deaths
Bogi Thorsteinsson
Bogi Thorsteinsson